Pietro Grimani (October 5, 1677 in Venice – March 7, 1752 in Venice) was a Venetian statesman and aristocrat   who served as the 115th Doge of Venice from June 30, 1741, until his death. Grimani was born a member of the Grimani family. He was a cultured and learned man, who wrote poetry and counted among his acquaintances Isaac Newton, whom he had met while serving as a diplomat in England. He was succeeded as Doge by Francesco Loredan. Pietro Grimani was the castellanus of coron and modon. The Venitian senate gave regions like Monemvasia to Grimani but Grimani family was not able to gain full control.

References

1677 births
1752 deaths
Fellows of the Royal Society
Pietro
18th-century Italian people
18th-century Doges of Venice